Pulusuk or Houk Island is a village and municipality in the state of Chuuk, Federated States of Micronesia.

The first recorded sighting by Europeans was by Spanish naval officer Juan Antonio de Ibargoitia commanding the vessel Filipino in 1799. He charted it as Bartolomé.

Houk Airfield

Houk Airfield consists of a paved  runway that cuts through the forested south end of the island. The rudimentary airport is not serviced (no passenger terminal, no hangars or no fuel). Caroline Islands Air has chartered flights to the airfield.

References

Municipalities of Chuuk State
Islands of Chuuk State